The Women's individual large hill competition at the FIS Nordic World Ski Championships 2023 was held on 28 February and 1 March 2023.

Results

Qualification
The qualification was held on 28 February at 18:30.

Final
The first round was started on 1 March at 17:30 and the final round at 18:40.

References

Women's individual large hill